The 2016 Caribbean Series (Serie del Caribe) is the 58th edition of the international competition featuring the champions of the Cuban National Series, Dominican Professional Baseball League, Mexican Pacific League, Puerto Rican Professional Baseball League, and Venezuelan Professional Baseball League. It took place February 1–7 at Estadio Quisqueya in Santo Domingo, Dominican Republic. The teams played a ten-game round robin, followed by the semifinals and championship game.

For the first time, the tournament featured a home run derby, however Major League Baseball players were barred from participating due to complaints from Major League Baseball Players Association over injury risks.

Round robin

Schedule
Time zone Atlantic Standard Time (UTC–4)

Standings

Playoff round

Semifinals

Final

References

External links
Official Site

Caribbean
2016 in Caribbean sport
Caribbean Series
2016
International baseball competitions hosted by the Dominican Republic
February 2016 sports events in North America
Sports competitions in Santo Domingo
21st century in Santo Domingo